Wycliffe College is a public school (co-educational, private,  boarding and day school) in Stonehouse, Gloucestershire, England, founded in 1882 by G. W. Sibly. It comprises a Nursery School for ages 2–4, a Preparatory School for ages 4–13, and a Senior School for ages 13–18. In total, there are approximately 800 pupils enrolled at the school. The college is set in 60 acres of land. In 2018, The Duchess of Gloucester officially opened a new £6 million boarding house named Ward's-Ivy Grove. The college attracts students from many areas of the world.

Wycliffe is a member school of The Headmasters' and Headmistresses' Conference (HMC). The Good Schools Guide stated that Wycliffe is "A school which offers a way of life as much as an education...A real gem of a school." The Independent Schools Inspectorate rated Wycliffe as either Excellent or Good in all areas in its most recent inspection (March 2016).

For the academic year 2018-2019, Wycliffe charges up to £36,570 for boarders and £20,985 for day pupils in the senior school. Fees in the prep school are up to £28,260 for boarders and £15,795 for day pupils.

Nursery School
The Nursery, which first opened in 1983 at the Grove, and was originally located within the same grounds as the Preparatory School boarding houses and sports fields. The Grove, a house built of Cotswold stone, was destroyed by fire in 1994. In 2012 the nursery school split into the nursery and pre-prep departments, the latter being moved to join with the Preparatory school.

Wycliffe Preparatory  School
The Prep School has extensive sports grounds separated by a main road from the main campus. The pupils use a specially built bridge to cross over the road safely. The Prep School has two boarding houses: Pennwood housing the male boarders and Windrush housing the female boarders.

The Senior School

The Senior School is located a short walk away from the Preparatory School. With over 400 students, the Senior School is the largest campus of the three. The main reception is located in School House – the principal building in the College.

Students are separated into eight different houses. With the exceptions of Collingwood House, a mixed house for day pupils, and Loosley, a mixed sixth form boarding house, the houses are single gender boarding houses.  One of the school's boarding houses, Haywardsend, is one of the town's oldest buildings, an old Tudor farmhouse. Haywardsfield, an imposing three-story red brick house at the head of the school drive, is the school's oldest boarding house. The newest boarding house, Wards-Ivy Grove, completed in 2017, was designed as split gender houses: Wards and Ivy Grove, with a future-proof design feature allowing it to rapidly convert to single gender accommodation whenever required.

Sibly Hall, named in honour of the school's founder, is the school's main function hall. The school's music department is a dedicated building located near the centre of the senior campus.

In 1911, a Wesleyan chapel was built in the grounds of Wycliffe College; although built with money subscribed by those connected with the school and mainly used by the school, it was also the chapel of the local Methodist community. A tower and spire were added in 1921. The chapel was gutted by fire in 1939 and rebuilt in the late 1950s, with much of the stone coming from the church at Frocester. Its tower is Grade II listed. The chapel holds popular and well attended annual Christmas Carol Services for the school and local community.

Accreditation
The school is the first independent school in the country to have achieved recognition with National Academy for Able Children in Education (NACE). The school has also achieved 'CReSTeD' accreditation for teaching dyslexic pupils. A 2010 Ofsted inspection report on the School's capability to help children to achieve well and enjoy what they do rated the provision as outstanding, noting the "extensive support networks for all boarders within the school".

Sport
Wycliffe is a major squash-playing school, due to their continuous success in the squash court. The school currently holds many national squash titles, and it is also the first school to hold both the U15 and U19 National titles at the same time. Old Wycliffians have also gone on to represent their home nations in international events such as the Commonwealth Games.
Among other options, pupils may choose squash as either a games option or an extra-curricular activity.

Since 1935, Wycliffe's Boat Club has had a boathouse of its own, located at Saul Junction on the Gloucester-Sharpness Canal with around 30 km of still training water.

Curriculum
The academic structure targets exams of both standard English curriculum GCSE and the International GCSE, and A-level subjects at  the standard English curriculum. The school currently offers 21 subject choices at GCSE, and 27 at Sixth Form level. Other activities include a Combined Cadet Force and a Duke of Edinburgh Award scheme. Extracurricular activities include: Horse riding club, Fencing club, Cryptology club, Science club, Beekeeping, Shooting, Model United Nations among many others.

Head Teachers (Senior)
 G. W. Sibly (1882–1912)
 W. A. Sibly (1912–1947)
 S. G. H. Loosley (1947–1967)
 R. D. H. Roberts (1967–1980)
 Richard Poulton (1980–6)
 Tony Millard (1987–1993)
 David Prichard (1994–1998)
 Tony Collins (1998–2005)
 Margie E Burnet Ward (2005–2015)
 Nick Gregory (2015–present)

Notable alumni
Former pupils of the school are known as Old Wycliffians or OWs. Alumni become life members of the Society when they leave the school. The principal aim of the Society is to keep members of the worldwide Wycliffian family in touch with each other.

Notable Old Wycliffians include:

 Charlie Barnett (cricketer), (1910–1993), Gloucestershire and England cricketer.
 Ananda Coomaraswamy (1877–1947), philosopher and art historian 
 William Wasbrough Foster DSO CMG, Canadian businessman, Police and Army officer.
 Brian Fothergill (1921–1990), biographer 
 Alex Gidman Gloucestershire and England A cricket captain
 Roger Gray (1921–1992), High Court judge and first-class cricketer
 Sir Michael Graydon,  Chief of the Air Staff of the Royal Air Force (1992–1997)
 Jeffrey Harborne, phytochemist
 Somerville Hastings (1878–1967), surgeon and politician 
Ernest William Jones (1870 - 1941), first class cricketer and trans-European maritime transport magnate
 Denis Malone, Chief Justice of Belize and later the Cayman Islands
 John May, Vice-Chairman of the World Scout Committee, Secretary General of the Duke of Edinburgh's Award
 William Moseley, actor.
Jeremy Nicholas (Woolcock) - actor, writer, broadcaster, musician
 Mike Osborne, jazz musician.
 Camilla Pang, computational biologist and author.
 Gilbert Parkhouse, Glamorgan and England cricketer.
 Ben Parkin, Member of Parliament for Stroud (1945–50) Paddington North (1953–69)
 Tim Payne, England rugby player
 Mark Porter, medical doctor and media person.
 Charlie Sharples, Gloucester rugby winger.
 Sir Franklin Sibly (1883–1948), geologist and university administrator.
 Jon Silkin, poet
 Sir William Stanier, railway engineer
 Charlie Stayt, presenter of BBC Breakfast on BBC One
 Al Stewart, singer-songwriter, notable for his 1976 world wide hit record 'Year of the Cat'
 Jun Tanaka, chef and author
 Geoffrey Tovey, serologist and founder of UK Transplant service
 John Duncan, Governor of the British Virgin Islands

References

External links
 Wycliffe College
 Prep & College profiles at the Independent Schools Council website

Member schools of the Headmasters' and Headmistresses' Conference
Private schools in Gloucestershire
Boarding schools in Gloucestershire
Educational institutions established in 1882
Stroud District
1882 establishments in England